Sofía Fernández Castañón (born 1 November 1983) is a Spanish poet, writer, audiovisual producer, and politician. She has worked in print, television, and radio, and received several poetry prizes. Since January 2016 she has been a member of the Spanish Congress of Deputies for Podemos, representing Asturias, and since 2020 she has served as deputy spokesperson for the Unidas Podemos Confederal Parliamentary Group. In December 2021 she was elected leader of the regional branch of the party, Podemos Asturies. Furthermore, since 2017 she has been a member of the party's national board, where she has served first as Secretary of Intersectional Feminisms and LGTBI and currently as Secretary of Cultures.

Biography
The daughter of Asturian writer Laura Castañón, she grew up surrounded by books. She studied Spanish Philology at the University of Oviedo, and combines her poetic activity with journalistic work and creative writing workshops. She has published several books of poetry in Castilian and Asturian, for which she has received awards such as the Asturias Joven in 2006, the Pablo García Baena de Poesía Joven in 2007, and the Nené Losada Rico in 2009.

From 2009 to 2010 she was a scholarship holder for the City Council of Madrid in the Residencia de Estudiantes, and was one of La Casa Encendida's 2010 Voz + Joven poets.

In 2010 and 2011 she directed the radio show El sillón Voltaire on Radio del Círculo de Bellas Artes in Madrid.

From 2012 to 2015 she coordinated municipal reading clubs in Gijón and gave workshops on literary creation and audiovisual narrative, as well as participating in the humorous collective Fundición Príncipe de Astucias (now Fundición Princesa de Astucias).

She participates in the audiovisual production company Señor Paraguas, for which she has created music videos, documentaries, and video art, focusing on culture from a social and political perspective.

She directed her first feature film with this company in 2014, the documentary Se dice poeta. In it, Castañón interviews 21 women born between 1974 and 1989 to discuss their relationship with poetry, criticism, and the dissemination of their work. Taking as a starting point the question about why the term poetess may be preferred if the definition of the word poet encompasses both men and women, this documentary looks at the role of gender in the current poetic panorama in Spain.

For Televisión del Principado de Asturias (TPA), she directed the collection Dicires, a visual dictionary of Asturian in 120 clips. She has also written articles for media outlets such as El Comercio, La Corriente Alterna, La Nueva España, Hesperya, Diagonal, and the Huffington Post.

Political career
From January 2015 to February 2017 Castañón was a member of the Citizen Council of Podemos Xixón. In July 2015, she participated in the Podemos state primaries in the list promoted by the national management of Pablo Iglesias, and which was included on the alternative list proposed by the Asturian and Andalusian groups. She was the candidate who received the most votes, with 36,685.

During the Constituent Session of the Congress of the 11th Legislature, she used Asturian to pledge her position with the following formula: "I promise to abide by this Constitution and work to change it. For the memory of our grandmothers, for the future of our children. Never again a country without its people and its towns."

She returned as a candidate in the general elections of July 2016 and was reelected to her seat in the Congress of Deputies, where she is currently the spokesperson of the Equality Commission and a member of the Subcommittee on the State Pact on Gender Violence.

At the Vistalegre II meeting she was a candidate on the Pablo Iglesias list and was elected a member of the Podemos State Citizen Council, ranking 14th with 3,574,113 points (28.79%).

On 18 February 2017, she was elected Secretary of Intersectional Feminism and LGBTI, a position that had not previously existed in the Podemos Executive, and that had been held by Clara Serra in the Citizen Council.

Works

Poetry

In Castilian
 Animales interiores (2006 Asturias Joven Award, Trabe 2007)
 Últimas cartas a Kansas (2007 Pablo García Baena Award, La Bella Varsovia 2008)
 La noche así (Ya lo dijo Casimiro Parker, 2012)
 La otra hija (Suburbia Ediciones, 2013)
 Prohibido silbar (Baile del Sol, 2014)

In Asturian
 Tiempu de render (2009 Nené Losada Award, Trabe 2010)
 Destruimientu del xardín (Hesperya, 2012)

Anthologies
 Hank Over/Resaca (Caballo de Troya, 2008)
 23 Pandoras (Baile del Sol, 2009)
 Poetas asturianos para el siglo XXI (Trea, 2009)
 Por partida doble (Trabe, 2009)
 El libro del voyeur (anthologist and illustrator: , Ediciones del Viento, 2010)
 Esto no rima (Origami, 2012)
 Gente de Nod (anthologist: , photographs: Alejandro Nafría; KRK, 2016)

Booklets
 La sombra de Peter Pan (2009)
 Culpa de Pavlov (2008 Jóvenes Creadores del Ayto Award of Madrid, Colección Resurrección 2012)

Documentaries
 Se dice poeta (2014). Director

Awards
 2006 Astragal Award
 2006 Asturias Joven de Poesía
 2007 Pablo García Baena de Poesía Joven
 2009 Nené Losada Rico
 2010 La Casa Encendida Voz + Joven
 2012 Astragal Award for the exhibit Paraíso postal

References

External links

 
  
 

1983 births
21st-century Spanish women writers
Film directors from Asturias
Writers from Asturias
Living people
Members of the 11th Congress of Deputies (Spain)
Members of the 12th Congress of Deputies (Spain)
People from Gijón
Podemos (Spanish political party) politicians
Spanish documentary film directors
Spanish philologists
Spanish women film directors
Spanish women poets
University of Oviedo alumni
Women members of the Congress of Deputies (Spain)
Women philologists
Women documentary filmmakers
Members of the 13th Congress of Deputies (Spain)
Members of the 14th Congress of Deputies (Spain)